Arunava Majumdar is a materials scientist, engineer, and the inaugural dean of the Stanford Doerr School of Sustainability. He was nominated for the position of Under Secretary of Energy in the United States between November 30, 2011 and May 15, 2012. He was previously the Director of the Environmental Energy Technologies Division at the Lawrence Berkeley National Laboratory, where he was also deputy director of LBNL as well as professor of mechanical engineering at the University of California, Berkeley. He was nominated to be the first director of the U.S. Department of Energy's Advanced Research Projects Agency-Energy (ARPA-E) and appointed to that position in September 2009.

In 2012, he joined Google to drive Google.org's energy initiatives and advise the company on their broader energy strategy. He is now the Jay Precourt Professor at Stanford University, where he serves on the faculty of the Department of Mechanical Engineering and is a Senior Fellow of the Precourt Institute for Energy. He also served on the Engineering and Computer Science jury for the Infosys Prize from 2012 to 2016.

He completed his PhD at University of California, Berkeley after a bachelor's at Indian Institute of Technology Bombay. His scientific work is in the fields of thermoelectric materials, heat and mass transfer, thermal management, and waste heat recovery. He has published several hundred papers, patents, and conference proceedings. In 2005, Majumdar was elected a member of the National Academy of Engineering for contributions to nanoscale thermal engineering and molecular nanomechanics. He served as one of the Science Envoys of the US in 2014.

In November 2020, Majumdar was named a volunteer member of the Joe Biden presidential transition Agency Review Team to support transition efforts related to the United States Department of Energy, Federal Energy Regulatory Commission, and the Nuclear Regulatory Commission.

References

External links
ARPA-E
Arun Majumdar's research group at Stanford
Arun Majumdar at LBNL

Indian emigrants to the United States
IIT Bombay alumni
Living people
Indian materials scientists
UC Berkeley College of Engineering alumni
Year of birth missing (living people)